Joseph Matthew Gubbins (born 3 August 2001) is an English footballer who plays as a defender for EFL Championship side Queens Park Rangers.

Career
Gubbins made his professional debut with Queens Park Rangers in a 5-1 FA Cup win over Swansea City on 5 January 2020.

On 6 October 2020, Gubbins joined National League South side Oxford City on a one month loan deal.

On 27 November 2021, Gubbins joined National League side Aldershot Town on a one-month loan deal.

On 24 March 2022, Gubbins joined National League side Southend United on loan for the remainder of the 2021–22 season.

Career statistics

References

External links

QPR Profile

2001 births
Living people
English footballers
Association football defenders
Queens Park Rangers F.C. players
Aldershot Town F.C. players
Oxford City F.C. players
Southend United F.C. players
English Football League players
National League (English football) players